Fool, The Fool, or Fools may refer to:

A jester, also called a fool, a type of historical entertainer known for their witty jokes
An insult referring to someone of low intelligence or easy gullibility

Arts, entertainment and media

Fictional characters
 Fool (stock character) in literature and folklore
 Shakespearean fool, an archetypal character in numerous works by Shakespeare

Film
 A Fool, a 2015 Chinese film directed by Chen Jianbin
 Fools (1970 film), an American film
 Fools (2003 film), an Indian film directed by Dasari Narayana Rao
 The Fool (1913 film), a 1913 British silent film
 The Fool (1925 film), a lost silent film
 The Fool (1990 film), a British film
 The Fool (2014 film), a Russian film

Gaming and Tarot
 Fool (card game)
 The Fool (Tarot card games)
 The Fool (cartomantic Tarot cards)

Literature
 Fool (novel), a 2009 novel by Christopher Moore
 Fools (play), a 1981 play by Neil Simon
 The Fool (novel), an 1880 Armenian language novel by Raffi
 The Fool, a 1921 novel by H. C. Bailey
 The Fool (play), a 1975 play by Edward Bond
 The Fool (fictional character), a fictional character in The Realm of the Elderlings by Robin Hobb

Music
 The Fool (design collective), a Dutch design collective and band in the 1960s
 The Fool (guitar), a 1964 Gibson SG designed by The Fool for Eric Clapton
 The Fools, a musical group from Massachusetts, U.S.

Albums
 Fool (Joe Jackson album), 2019
 The Fool (The Fool album), 1968
 The Fool (Ryn Weaver album), 2015
 The Fool (Warpaint album), 2010
 Fools (The Reason album), 2010
 Fools (EP), by Lauren Aquilina, 2012

Songs 
 "Fool" (Elvis Presley song), 1973
 "Fool (If You Think It's Over)", a song by Chris Rea, 1978
 "Fool" by Blur, from the 1991 album Leisure
 "Fool" by Cat Power, from the 2003 album You Are Free
 "Fool" by Dragon, from the 1984 album Body and the Beat
 Fool (Mansun song), from the 2000 album Little Kix
 "Fool" by The Rasmus, from the 2006 album Peep
 "Fool" by Roxette, from their 2001 album Room Service
 "Fool" by Shakira, from the 2001 album Laundry Service
 "Fool" by Swans from the album Greed 
 "Fool (#2)" by Swans from the album Holy Money
 "Fool (I Feel Bad for You)" by Medina, from the U.S. release of 2012 Forever album
 "The Fool" (Sanford Clark song), 1956
 "The Fool" (Lee Ann Womack song), 1997
 "The Fool", a 1971 single by Gilbert Montagné
 "The Fool" by Neutral Milk Hotel, from the album In the Aeroplane over the Sea
 "The Fool" by Camper Van Beethoven, from the 1988 album Our Beloved Revolutionary Sweetheart
 "The Fool" by The Fixx, from the 1982 album Shuttered Room
 "The Fool" by Quicksilver Messenger Service, from the 1968 album Quicksilver Messenger Service
 "The Fool" by Luna Halo from their 2007 self-titled album
 "Fools" (Alphaville song), 1994
 "Fools" by Deep Purple, from their 1971 album Fireball
 "Fools" by Rachel Stevens, from the 2003 album Funky Dory
 "Fools" by Troye Sivan, from the 2015 album Wild
 "Fools" by Uriah Heep, from the 1980 album Conquest
 "Fools" by Van Halen, from the 1980 album Women and Children First
 Fool" (Fitz and the Tantrums song), 2017

Food
 Fruit fool, a dish made with cooked fruit such as gooseberries or bilberries
 Ful (pronounced "fool") or ful medames, a Middle Eastern dish made from fava beans

Other uses 
 Léon-Mba International Airport, Libreville, Gabon, ICAO airport code FOOL
 The Motley Fool, a financial advice company (fool.com) nicknamed "the Fool"

See also

 Folly (disambiguation)
 Foolish (disambiguation)
 Foolishness, the unawareness or lack of social norms which causes offence, annoyance, trouble or injury
 FoolishPeople, a British theatre collective
 Fools Guild, a social club of comedic performers
 Foolscap (disambiguation)
 List of jesters
 Clown
 Harlequin
 Jester (disambiguation)
 Joker (disambiguation)
 Magic (illusion)
 Stupidity 
 Tomfoolery
 Yokel